Kimball J. Daniels (born January 19, 1973) is a Canadian former professional ice hockey player who played parts of two seasons in the National Hockey League (NHL) for the Philadelphia Flyers.

Playing career
Daniels's career started with the Swift Current Broncos of the WHL, where he racked up at least 50 points in each of his three seasons. On October 2, 1990, against the Medicine Hat Tigers, Daniels scored all 7 goals in a 7-4 win that still stands as a WHL record for goals in a game by one player. He then had two brief stints with the Philadelphia Flyers of the NHL, before an injury to his knee and leg forced him to return to the WHL, where he would have 21-point seasons for the Seattle Thunderbirds and the Tri-City Americans. After stints in the IHL and AHL, Daniels started to see improvement in the ECHL, a league that was less than ten years old when he started play in the 95–96 season with the Jacksonville Lizard Kings. He topped 30 points that year, and he would get close to that mark over the next three years with the Charlotte Checkers and the Wheeling Nailers.

After some time in the IHL and AHL, Daniels's return to the ECHL with the New Orleans Brass and the Tallahassee Tiger Sharks would once again give him a slight improvement in stats. He was then shipped to the Anchorage Aces of the WCHL, where his stats took a huge spike with three seasons of 89 points, 62 points, and 63 points respectively. The WCHL then folded operations, which forced the Aces to merge into the ECHL and become the Alaska Aces. Despite Daniels drop in stats as a result of the change, the Aces won the Kelly Cup championship for the 05–06 season. Daniels led the Aces team in scoring with 81 points and volleyed between the top three scoring spots for the entire ECHL league in 06–07. He also notched his 400th point as an Ace.

On September 16, 2008, Daniels moved from the Alaska Aces to the Phoenix RoadRunners.

Personal life

Daniels was born in Estevan, Saskatchewan, but grew up in Brandon, Manitoba.  He has two children, Kaden and Claire. He is currently engaged to a Colleen Turley and resides in Anchorage, AK.

Career statistics

External links
 

1972 births
Living people
Alaska Aces (ECHL) players
Anchorage Aces players
Baltimore Bandits players
Canadian expatriate ice hockey players in Slovenia
Canadian expatriate ice hockey players in the United States
Canadian ice hockey centres
Charlotte Checkers (1993–2010) players
Detroit Falcons (CoHL) players
Hamilton Bulldogs (AHL) players
HDD Olimpija Ljubljana players
Ice hockey people from Saskatchewan
Jacksonville Lizard Kings players
Kildonan North Stars players
Minnesota Moose players
New Orleans Brass players
People from Estevan
Philadelphia Flyers draft picks
Philadelphia Flyers players
Phoenix RoadRunners players
Providence Bruins players
Quebec Citadelles players
Quebec Rafales players
Rochester Americans players
Salt Lake Golden Eagles (IHL) players
San Antonio Dragons players
Seattle Thunderbirds players
Swift Current Broncos players
Tallahassee Tiger Sharks players
Tri-City Americans players
Wheeling Nailers players